Nizhne-Kubensky is a rural locality (a settlement) in Kubenskoye Rural Settlement, Kharovsky District, Vologda Oblast, Russia. The population was 248 as of 2010. There are 8 streets.

Geography 
Nizhne-Kubensky is located 29 km northwest of Kharovsk (the district's administrative centre) by road. Zarubino is the nearest rural locality.

References 

Rural localities in Kharovsky District